Pennant Hills railway station is located on the Main Northern line, serving the Sydney suburb of Pennant Hills. It is served by Sydney Trains T9 Northern Line services.

History

Pennant Hills station opened on 17 September 1886. In the 1990s, the station received an upgrade being fitted with lifts. Immediately north of Pennant Hills, a short four track section of the Main Northern line begins which runs to the next station at Thornleigh.

As part of the North Sydney Freight Corridor project, an electrified passing loop was built behind the western platform where it joined the existing loop. As part of these works the western platform was converted to an island. The new platform opened on 14 June 2016.

Platforms and services

Trackplan

References

External links

Pennant Hills station details Transport for New South Wales

Easy Access railway stations in Sydney
Railway stations in Sydney
Railway stations in Australia opened in 1886
Main North railway line, New South Wales
Hornsby Shire